The Sambre is a river in northern France and in Wallonia, Belgium. It is a left-bank tributary of the Meuse, which it joins in the Wallonian capital Namur.

The source of the Sambre is near Le Nouvion-en-Thiérache, in the Aisne département. It passes through the Franco-Belgian coal basin, formerly an important industrial district. The navigable course begins in Landrecies at the junction with the Canal de la Sambre à l'Oise, which links with the central French waterway network (or did, until navigation was interrupted in 2006 following structural failures). It runs 54 km and 9 locks 38.50m long and 5.20m wide down to the Belgian border at Jeumont. From the border the river is canalised in two distinct section over a distance of 88 km with 17 locks. The Haute-Sambre is 39 km long and includes 10 locks of the same dimensions as in France, down to the industrial town of Charleroi. The rest of the Belgian Sambre was upgraded to European Class IV dimensions (1350-tonne barges) in the immediate post-World War II period. It lies at the western end of the sillon industriel, which is still Wallonia's industrial backbone, despite the cessation of all coal-mining and decline in the steel industry. The river flows into the Meuse at Namur, Belgium.

The navigable waterway is managed in France by Voies Navigables de France and in Belgium by the Service Public Wallon - Direction générale opérationnelle de la Mobilité et des Voies hydrauliques (Operational Directorate of Mobility and Inland Waterways)

Course 
The Sambre flows through the following départements of France, provinces of Belgium and towns:
 Aisne (F): Barzy-en-Thiérache
 Nord (F): Landrecies, Aulnoye-Aymeries, Hautmont, Maubeuge
 Hainaut (B): Thuin, Montigny-le-Tilleul, Charleroi
 Namur (B): Floreffe, Namur

Main tributaries

Events
 On 24 February 1912, Regina Magritte, the mother of the famous surrealist painter Réné Magritte, drowned herself in this river at Châtelet.

Battles
The 19th-century theory that the Sambre was the location of Julius Caesar's battle against a Belgic confederation (57 BC), was discarded a long time ago, but is still repeated.

Three important battles were fought in Fleurus, a suburb of Charleroi on the north bank of the Sambre: the Thirty Years' War Battle of Fleurus (1622), the Nine Years' War Battle of Fleurus (1690), and the crucial 26 June 1794 Battle of Fleurus (1794), the most significant battle of the Flanders Campaign in the Low Countries during the French Revolutionary Wars. The last was fought on both banks of the river, culminating a campaign that had involved multiple crossings and re-crossings of the river.

Heavy fighting occurred along the river during World War I, especially at the siege of Namur in 1914 (Battle of Charleroi) and in the last month of the war Battle of the Sambre (1918).

References

External links

 River Sambre and Canal de la Sambre à l'Oise with maps and details of places, moorings and facilities for boats, by the author of Inland Waterways of France, Imray
 Navigation details for 80 French rivers and canals (French waterways website section)

 
Rivers of Belgium
Rivers of France
International rivers of Europe
Rivers of Aisne
Rivers of Nord (French department)
Rivers of Wallonia
Rivers of Hauts-de-France
Rivers of Namur (province)
Rivers of Hainaut (province)
Geography of Namur (city)